Cabaret Shangai (a.k.a. Cabaret Shaghai) is a Mexican drama film directed by Juan Orol. It was released in 1950 and starred Rosa Carmina and Orol.

Plot
Alberto (Robert Romaña), the confidant of Tony (Juan Orol), a gangster owner of the Cabaret Shanghai, departs from the business when his boss's lover, Mary Ruth (Rosa Carmina) shown affectionate with him. The destination will soon torment these cursed lovers, who will be chased by the police as well as by the betrayed gangster.

Cast
 Rosa Carmina ... Mary Ruth
 Juan Orol ... Tony
 Roberto Romaña ... Alberto
 Manuel Arvide ... Inspector
 Amparo Arozamena ... Prostitute
 Amelia Wilhelmy ... Drunk woman
 Tana Lynn ... American Woman
 Marco de Carlo ... Marcos
 Juanita Riverón ... Rita

Reviews
The musical numbers of Rosa Carmina in the cabaret adorn this melodrama directed by the incomparable Juan Orol, who transcends the rules of the genre to mix both the gangster films as the romantic drama.

References

External links
 
 Cine Mexicano de Galletas: Cabaret Shanghai

1950 films
Gangster films
Mexican black-and-white films
Rumberas films
1950s Spanish-language films
Mexican drama films
1950 drama films
1950s Mexican films